This is a list of East Frisian people who are important to the region of East Frisia and its history in that they have played a key role in the region or are otherwise renowned and closely linked to East Frisia.

Other East Frisian lists 
 List of counts of East Frisia
 List of countesses of East Frisia

Art and culture 
 Ludolf Bakhuizen, artist
 Eggerik Beninga, Frisian chronicler
 Philipp Heinrich Erlebach, composer
 Rudolf Eucken, German Nobel prize winner for literature, 1908
 Martin Faber, architect, artist and cartographer
 Recha Freier, Swiss-born playwright, holder of the Israeli State Prize
 Hans-Joachim Hespos, composer
 the family of Ub Iwerks
 Hermann Lübbe, philosopher
 Henri Nannen, publisher
 Uwe Rosenberg, game inventor

Film, TV and radio 
 Heiko Engelkes, journalist, ARD correspondent in Paris, author
 Okka Gundel, presenter on Sportschau and tagesschau24
 Eva Herman, presenter, newscaster and playwright
 Wolfgang Petersen, Hollywood director of inter alia Das Boot and Troy
 Helma Sanders-Brahms, director

History 
 Edzard the Great, East Frisian count
 Klaus Störtebeker, pirate during the time of the Hanseatic League
 Balthasar von Esens, pirate
 Max Windmüller, German-Jewish resistance fighter against Nazism
 Dodo zu Innhausen und Knyphausen, military commander during the Thirty Years' War

Musicians and comedians 
 Carl Carlton (German musician), rock musician
 Karl Dall, comedian, actor, entertainer
 H.P. Baxxter, real name: Hans-Peter Geerdes, front man of the techno band Scooter
 Al Shean, US American-German comedian
 Theodore Thomas, born Theodor Thomas, musician, composer, founder of the Chicago Symphony Orchestra
 Otto Waalkes, comedian, actor

Politics 
 Gesine Agena, politician and speaker for the Grüne Jugend
 Gitta Connemann, MdB
 Garrelt Duin, former leader of the SPD in Lower Saxony, MdB

Sport 
 Christian Alder, footballer
 Dieter Eilts, footballer
 Karsten Fischer, footballer
 Bernd Flessner, windsurfer (15-time German champion)
 Heidi Hartmann, world boxing champion
 Marco Kutscher, showjumper (European and Olympic bronze medallist)
 Silvia Rieger, track and field athlete (hurdles)
 Ferydoon Zandi, footballer

Theology 
 Menso Alting
 David Fabricius, theologian, important amateur astronomer and cartographer
 Eduard Norden, philologist and religious historian

Science 
 Eggerik Beninga, chronicler
 Hermann Conring, legal scholar
 Ubbo Emmius, pastor, historian and founder of the University of Groningen
 Rudolf Eucken, philosopher
 Johannes Fabricius, one of the discoverers of sunspots
 Wilhelm von Freeden, German mathematician, scientist and oceanographer, founder of the North German Hydrographic Office in Hamburg
 Rudolf von Jhering, German lawyer
 Hermann Lübbe, philosopher
 Hans-Wilhelm Müller-Wohlfahrt, sports doctor and doctor to the Germany National Football Team and FC Bayern Munich
 Johann Christian Reil, doctor and professor

Other people 
 Jan van Koningsveld, world champion in mental arithmetic
 Minnie Schönberg, mother of the Marx Brothers, who came from Dornum 
 Tamme Hanken, vet and TV presenter

Literature 
 Martin Tielke (ed.): Biographisches Lexikon für Ostfriesland. Ostfriesische Landschaft, Aurich, 1993 , 5 volumes, Vol. 4, 2007.

! People
East Frisia